Ahmed Mushaima is a Bahraini footballer who played at 2011 AFC Asian Cup.  He has also played in the Bahraini Premier League

References

Living people
Bahraini footballers
Bahrain international footballers
Year of birth missing (living people)
Footballers at the 2010 Asian Games
Association football goalkeepers
Asian Games competitors for Bahrain